The Old Mill, Ruthin, Denbighshire, North Wales was designated Grade II listed building on the 24 October 1950; the mill probably dates from around 1300. The Warden of Ruthin, the early 19th century, Archdeacon  Newcome, noted that the building had been used as a garrison chapel. There are two early English pointed arches and one gable end has a blocked lancet window, with a sunken cross above. The watermill was removed from the mill during the 1950s and Mill St runs to the side of the old mill.

River Clwyd

Power for the mill came from the River Clwyd which runs nearby. The river also serviced the woollen and leather industries in Borthyn and Mwrog St. The car park at Cae Ddôl is known locally as Crispin Yard, named after the patron saint of shoe makers St Crispin reflecting the leather industry that thrived in the area. The river was bridged by a water gate there is no evidence when this was demolished. Today a road bridge, known as Pont Howkin crosses the river; it was originally built in 1771 and formerly known as Pont Newydd.

References

Rhuthun Hanesyddol / Historic Ruthin (1979) and Ruthin Archives

Grade II listed buildings in Ruthin
Water mills in Denbighshire